Strictly speaking, penetration occurs when a projectile enters a target without passing through it and perforation occurs when the projectile completely passes through the target, but the word penetration is commonly used to refer to either.

Penetration into a semi-infinite or massive target is penetration (in the strict sense of the word) of targets so thick that the level of penetration is not affected by the target's thickness. There is a transition region between semi-infinite penetration and perforation, in which the target is not perforated but the projectile, as it nears the back face of the target, meets reduced resistance and is capable of penetrating a greater distance than it would in a semi-infinite target. This effect is variously named the back or rear surface, plate, or face effect and is also present when perforation occurs.

A penetrating projectile may cause the target to break into multiple pieces, spewing from both the front and back of the target, themselves at high velocity. These pieces are collectively referred to as spall. Spall can be generated even if a perforation is not achieved (the projectile fails to pass through the target), generated instead by the shock wave generated by the impact of the projectile.

Bombs designed for great penetration into the earth or for perforation of hardened targets are known as bunker busters.

Overpenetration

Excessive penetration or overpenetration occurs when a projectile completely passes through (perforates) its intended target and out of the other side, with enough residual kinetic energy to continue flying as a stray projectile, and risk causing unintended collateral damages to objects or persons beyond.  According to the energy transfer hypothesis, this happens because the projectile has not released all its energy within the target.

Ballistics